The South Main and Washington Streets Historic District — 68-139 Washington St. and 2-24 South Main St. is a historic district in South Norwalk, Connecticut. The  district encompasses 35 buildings and two other structures (including the South Norwalk Railroad Bridge). Varied architectural styles from the late 19th and early 20th centuries include Romanesque Revival, Second Empire, and Italianate architecture. Half of the area first became part of the National Register of Historic Places in 1977 (35 buildings and two structures).

The original district included 26 contributing buildings and 2 other contributing structures over a  area. The district was first increased to add 9 contributing buildings over a  area. The second increase added 10 contributing buildings over a  area.  The district is a densely packed area, with an 1895 railroad bridge at its "visual center".  Its "primary significance" is as "an extensive and cohesive collection of late 19th century and early 20th century commercial structures."

See also
National Register of Historic Places listings in Fairfield County, Connecticut

References

Historic districts in Fairfield County, Connecticut
Second Empire architecture in Connecticut
Italianate architecture in Connecticut
National Register of Historic Places in Fairfield County, Connecticut
Historic districts on the National Register of Historic Places in Connecticut